Contessina Antonia Romola di Lorenzo de' Medici (Pistoia, 1478 - Rome, 29 June 1515) was an Italian noblewoman, ninth child and fifth and last daughter of Lorenzo the Magnificent, Lord of Florence, and his wife Clarice Orsini. She was the wife of the Count Palatine Piero Ridolfi and the younger sister of Pope Leo X, as well as the cousin of Pope Clement VII.

Biography  
Contessina de' Medici was born in 1478 in Pistoia, where her mother and her siblings had taken refuge after the Pazzi conspiracy. She was baptized in Florence. Her first name, Contessina, was given to her in honor of her paternal great-grandmother, Contessina de' Bardi, wife of Cosimo de' Medici. 

She married the Count Palatine Piero Ridolfi (1467-1525) in May 1494: a prestigious marriage which further confirmed the continuing ascendence and power of the Medici. 

In 1513 her brother Giovanni was elected Pope with the name of Leo X. Contessina then moved to Rome with her sisters Lucrezia and Maddalena, where she established herself as an influential woman in papal politics. 

Contessina died on 29 June 1515 and was buried in the Church of Sant'Agostino in Rome. 

Since there is no news of Michelangelo's possible infatuation with her before 1845, so it is probably a legend born in the Romantic era.

Issue  
By her husband, Contessina had five children, three sons and two daughters: 

 Luigi Ridolfi (28 August 1495-1556), politician and ambassador;
 Emilia Ridolfi (1497-1514), married Prince Iacopo V Appiano, Lord of Piombino, but died before consummating the marriage;
 Clarice Ridolfi (1499-1524) in turn married Iacopo V Appiano;
 Niccolò Ridolfi (16 August 1501-1550), cardinal;
 Lorenzo Ridolfi (6 September 1503-1576), knight and apostolic secretary.

Notes

Sources 
https://web.archive.org/web/20070927014822/http://documents.medici.org/people_details.cfm?personid=4973
 Tomas, Natalie R. (2003). The Medici Women: Gender and Power in Renaissance Florence. Aldershot: Ashgate. ISBN 0754607771.

15th-century Italian women
Contessina di Lorenzo
Nobility from Florence
16th-century Italian women